Drenovac Banski is a village in central Croatia, in the municipality/town of Glina, Sisak-Moslavina County.

Demographics
According to the 2011 census, the village of Drenovac Banski had 74 inhabitants. This represents 16.37% of its pre-war population according to the 1991 census. 

Population by ethnicity

References

External links

Populated places in Sisak-Moslavina County
Serb communities in Croatia
Glina, Croatia